Aminah bint Wahb, was a woman of the clan of Banu Zuhrah in the tribe of Quraysh, and the mother of the Islamic prophet Muhammad.

Early life and marriage
Aminah was born to Wahb ibn Abd Manaf and Barrah bint 'Abd al-'Uzzā ibn 'Uthmān ibn 'Abd al-Dār in Mecca. Her tribe, Quraysh, claimed descent from Ibrahim (Abraham), through his son Isma'il (Ishmael). Her ancestor Zuhrah was the elder brother of Qusayy ibn Kilab, who was an ancestor of Abdullah ibn Abdul-Muttalib, and was the first Qurayshi custodian of the Kaaba. Abd al-Muttalib proposed the marriage of Abdullah, his youngest son, to Aminah. Some sources state that Aminah's father accepted the match, while others say that it was Aminah's uncle Wuhaib, who was serving as her guardian. The two were married soon after. Abdullah spent much of Aminah's pregnancy away from home as part of a merchant caravan, and died of disease before the birth of his son.

Birth of Muhammad and later years

Three months after Abdullah's death, in 570–571 CE, Muhammad was born. As was tradition among all the great families at the time, Aminah sent Muhammad to live with a milk mother in the desert as a baby. The belief was that in the desert, one would learn self-discipline, nobility, and freedom. During this time, Muhammad was nursed by Halimah bint Abi Dhuayb, a poor Bedouin woman from the tribe of Banu Sa'ad, a branch of the Hawāzin.

When Muhammad was six years old, he was reunited with Aminah, who took him to visit her relatives in Yathrib (later Medina). Upon their return to Mecca a month later, accompanied by her slave Umm Ayman, Aminah fell ill. She died around the year 577 or 578, and was buried in the village of Al-Abwa'. Her grave was destroyed in 1998. The young Muhammad was taken in first by his paternal grandfather Abd al-Muttalib in 577, and later by his paternal uncle Abu Talib ibn Abd al-Muttalib.

Fate in the afterlife

Islamic scholars have long been divided over the religious beliefs of Muhammad's parents and their fate in the afterlife. One transmission by Abu Dawud and Ibn Majah states that Allah (God) refused to forgive Aminah for her kufr (disbelief). Another transmission in Musnad al-Bazzar states that Muhammad's parents was brought back to life and accepted Islam, then returned to the Barzakh. Some Ash'ari and Shafi'i scholars argued that neither would be punished in the afterlife, as they were Ahl al-fatrah, or "People of the interval" between the prophetic messages of 'Isa (Jesus) and Muhammad. The concept of Ahl al-fatrah is not universally accepted among Islamic scholars, and there is debate concerning the extent of salvation available for active practitioners of Shirk (Polytheism), though the majority of scholars have come to agree with it, and disregard the ahadith (narrations) stating that Muhammad's parents were condemned to hell.

While a work attributed to Abu Hanifah, an early Sunni scholar, stated that both Aminah and Abdullah died upon their innate nature (Mata 'ala al-fitrah), some later authors of mawlid texts related a tradition in which Aminah and Abdullah were temporarily revived and embraced Islam. Scholars like Ibn Taymiyyah stated that this was a lie, though Al-Qurtubi stated that the concept did not disagree with Islamic theology. According to Ali al-Qari, the preferred view is that both the parents of Muhammad were Muslims. According to Al-Suyuti, Isma'il Haqqi, and other Islamic scholars, all of the narrations indicating that the parents of Muhammad were not forgiven were later abrogated when they were brought to life and accepted Islam. Shia Muslims believe that all of Muhammad's ancestors, Aminah included, were monotheists, and therefore entitled to Paradise. A Shia tradition states that Allah forbade the fires of Hell from touching either of Muhammad's parents. In the end, it is best to believe that all parents of the prophet are janati and will got to jannah

See also
 Adnan
 Adnanite Arabs
 Family tree of Muhammad
 Banu Hashim
 Halah bint Wahb
 Sahaba
 Wahb (name)

References

External links
 Victory News Magazine
 Brill Encyclopedia Islamica

549 births
577 deaths
6th-century Arabs
6th-century women
Family of Muhammad
Banu Zuhrah